Michail Jefimowitsch Alperin (Ukrainian: Миха́йло Юхи́мович Альпе́рін; 7 November 1956 – 11 May 2018) was a Soviet-Norwegian jazz pianist, known as a key member of the Moscow Art Trio.

Biography 
Alperin was born in Kamianets-Podilskyi, Ukrainian SSR to a Jewish family. He was educated in Khmelnytskyi, Bălți and Chișinău. In 1980, he formed one of the first jazz ensembles in Moldavian SSR. He moved to Moscow in the 1980s and founded the Moscow Art Trio with Arkady Shilkloper and folk singer Sergey Nikolaevich Starostin. He has also worked with Huun Huur Tu. From 1993 to 2018 he lived in Oslo, Norway; he was professor of music at the Norwegian Academy of Music and he supervised pianist Helge Lien and Morten Qvenild among others. He released several works on ECM Records. He died on 11 May 2018 at the age of 61.

Discography 
An asterisk (*) indicates that the year is that of release.

2008 — Moscow Art Trio & Norwegian Chamber Orchestra «Village Variations» (JARO 4290-2) Germany

2009 — Moscow Art Trio «Live in Holland» (CDDOMA 091102) Russia; (JARO 4302-2) Germany

2010 — The Bulgarian Voices Angelite with Huun-Huur-Tu & Moscow Art Trio «Legend» (JARO 4300-2) Germany

See also 

List of jazz pianists

References

External links 
Mikhail Alperin on ECM Records

1956 births
2018 deaths
Soviet jazz musicians
Soviet Jews
 Ukrainian composers
 Ukrainian jazz musicians
Jewish musicians
ECM Records artists
Jewish jazz musicians
Norwegian musicians
Norwegian Jews
Soviet emigrants to Norway
 Ukrainian emigrants to Norway
People from Kamianets-Podilskyi